Gratiola is a genus of plants in the family Plantaginaceae. Most species are known generally as hedgehyssops. The genus was previously included in the family Scrophulariaceae.

Species include:
Gratiola amphiantha - pool sprite, snorkelwort
Gratiola aurea - golden hedgehyssop
Gratiola brevifolia - sticky hedgehyssop
Gratiola ebracteata - bractless hedgehyssop
Gratiola flava - yellow hedgehyssop
Gratiola floridana - Florida hedgehyssop
Gratiola heterosepala - Boggs Lake hedgehyssop
Gratiola neglecta - clammy hedgehyssop
Gratiola officinalis - common hedgehyssop
Gratiola peruviana - Austral brooklime (native to South America and Australasia)
Gratiola pubescens - Hairy brooklime (native to Australia)
Gratiola quartermaniae - limestone hedgehyssop
Gratiola ramosa - branched hedgehyssop
Gratiola virginiana - roundfruit hedgehyssop
Gratiola viscidula - Short's hedgehyssop

Fossil record
Four  fossil seeds of †Gratiola tertiaria have been extracted from borehole samples of the Middle Miocene fresh water deposits in Nowy Sacz Basin, West Carpathians, Poland.

References

External links
 Jepson Manual Treatment

 
Plantaginaceae genera
Taxa named by Carl Linnaeus